Bulimulus diaphanus is a species of tropical air-breathing land snail, a pulmonate gastropod mollusk in the subfamily Bulimulinae.

Subspecies 
 Bulimulus diaphanus fraterculus (Potiez & Michaud, 1835)

Distribution 
Distribution of Bulimulus diaphanus fraterculus include Lesser Antilles:

 Saint Martin
 Saint Barts
 Saint Kitts
 Barbuda
 Antigua
 Guadeloupe
 Les Saintes
 Dominica - The first record for Dominica of this taxon has been in 2009. It is possible that Bulimulus diaphanus fraterculus was introduced to Dominica from one of the more northerly islands, where it was listed by Breure (1974).

References
This article incorporates CC-BY-3.0 text from the reference 

 Potiez, V.L. L. & Michaud, A. L. G., 1838 Galerie des mollusques, ou catalogue méthodique, descriptif et raisonné des mollusques et coquilles du Muséum de Douai, vol. I, p. 560 pp
  Breure, A. S. H., 1976. Types of Bulimulidae (Mollusca, Gastropoda) in the Muséum national d'Histoire naturelle, Paris. Bulletin du Muséum national d'Histoire naturelle 233 "1975": 1137-1187, sér. ser.3, part. Zoologie

Bulimulus